Divide the Sea is an American Christian hardcore and Christian metal band, where they primarily play a hardcore punk and metalcore styles of music. They come from Greenville, South Carolina. The band started making music in 2006. The band released, a studio album, Man, in 2010, with Blood and Ink Records.

Background
Divide the Sea is a Christian hardcore and Christian metal band from Greenville, South Carolina. Their members are Caleb Snead, Brett Sims, Jared Snead, Zach Paulus, and Micah Snead.

Music history
The band commenced as a musical entity in 2006, with their first release, Man, a studio album, that was released on January 26, 2010, from Blood and Ink Records. Levi MacAllister, reviewing the album for HM Magazine, states, "If Maylene and the Sons of Disaster had a baby, and old-Norma Jean/Luti-Kriss had a baby, and somehow, by the grace of God, those two babies got together and … had another baby – well, by golly, Divide The Sea’s fantastically produced Man would pop out with a bloodstream carrying a worshipful flare." Punknews.org rated the album one star, while Indie Vision Music rated it four stars.

Members
Current members
 Caleb Snead
 Brett Sims
 Jared Snead
 Zach Paulus
 Micah Snead

Past members
 Ryan Turner
 Ben Patat
 Randall Rainey

Discography
Studio albums
 Man (January 26, 2010, Blood and Ink)

References

External links
 Facebook profile
 Blood and Ink Records

Musical groups from South Carolina
2006 establishments in South Carolina
Musical groups established in 2006
Blood and Ink Records artists